Margot Knight is an Australian actress of television and stage, voice artist and a screenwriter, she was had numerous guest roles in TV series and telemovies, but is best known for her stints playing two roles in the highly popular cult series Prisoner (known internationally as Prisoner: Cell Block H), she played inmate Sharon Gilmour in 1980 and junior prison officer Terri Malone in 1985.

TV roles: Neighbours and Prisoner
Knight appeared in  Neighbours, playing two different roles Jean Richards in 1986 and Tracey Cox in 1997.
 
Her Prisoner appearances are notable because in addition to being one of the few cast members to play both a prisoner and a prison warder in the series, both of her roles were as the lesbian love interest to the show's main lesbian character at the time.

Sharon Gilmour was the scheming drug pushing girlfriend of long-term inmate Judy Bryant (Betty Bobbitt) (Judy's long stay in prison actually began because she deliberately had herself imprisoned to be with Sharon), and Terri Malone was a young prison officer who moved in with warder Joan Ferguson (Maggie Kirkpatrick).

Screenwriting
Knight is also a writer, and between 1990 and 1993, wrote several episodes of Neighbours, including episode 1721  which saw the death of the popular character Todd Landers played by Kristian Schmid. This episode is included on the DVD, Neighbours: Defining Moments.

Stage roles
Knight has also worked on stage plays since 1976. Her live work includes “Underground”, “The World Without Birds”, “Controlled Crying”, and “Richard II”.
In November 2011, Knight reunited with other Prisoner'' cast members for a fundraiser for Audacious Dreaming, to support HIV awareness.

Filmography

Screenwriter

References

External links

Australian film actresses
Australian soap opera actresses
Australian stage actresses
Living people
Year of birth missing (living people)
20th-century Australian actresses
21st-century Australian actresses